is a Japanese anime television series, based on an unused story by Monkey Punch. It premiered in Japan on the satellite station BS-i on April 9, 2006, and was also set to be broadcast across Japan by the anime satellite television network Animax from October 2006. It is also legally distributed over the Internet by GyaO from May 13, 2006. According to the producer, there were originally plans to broadcast the anime overseas, but they were scrapped due to poor reception of the anime.

Produced on a low budget, the series has been infamous for poor animation, and has attracted a cult following for this reason. It uses uncropped live photos for backgrounds, and its sound effects are completely out of synch with the animation. It is also the directorial debut for animator Yūki Kinoshita, who previously worked as a technical animation director, storyboard artist and key animator.

Overview
Musashi Gundoh is set in a fictional feudal era of Japan, where the Toyotomi Shogunate (instead of Tokugawa) governs the nation. The series deals with Musashi's battles against a group of monsters called "Ayakashi".

Quality issues
In 2006, Japan's televised anime market was severely oversaturated, at the breaking point of an anime bubble which had also hit America and Europe. Musashi was one of over 60 new shows airing during its season. The plot relies on many action scenes, which require a large amount of animation, and the direction of these scenes attempts to somehow mix complex traditional swordfight imagery with gunplay. However, due to the chronic shortage of human resources and budgets for the production, the animation issues became apparent on-screen, and soon viewers began to pay more attention to the degrading drawing quality and nonsensical settings than to the content of the plot. For this series, both the in-betweens and key animation were ordered from overseas, mainly from China, which was agreed upon in advance by the production team, and there were no sufficient meetings with the director and other domestic staff. Normally, production is finished within a week or two, and if the quality is still not good enough, it can be reworked or sent to the video editing process. However, in the production environment of Musashi Gundoh, the footage ordered from overseas was delivered to the director the day before it was to be broadcast for video editing, and there was no time to make corrections to the poor footage, so episodes were broadcast as is.

Yūki Kinoshita, the director, was not attempting to create a bad anime. He stated about the reaction of the viewers, "At first I was angry at the ridicule, but in the end, the viewers' voices encouraged me to work hard even in an environment that made me want to run away." He also said, "The degradation of the drawings in this anime could have recurred elsewhere. The fundamental problem is that there is too much being produced in the entire animation industry." In addition, when the DVDs were about to release, he said that he wanted to make as many corrections as possible so that his power would not be underestimated, but in the end, only the uncorrected versions were released.

Characters

Musashi side


He fights against the Ayakashi using two guns. He practices Gundoh in "ma' own style".
His notable line: 
In episode 2, Musashi scores a direct hit on an enemy, but it has no effect. After that, he abruptly shouts the aforementioned line. The line was not preceded by any bright scenes whatsoever, so viewers were left wondering why he said it with no provocation.


A master swordsman who has special swords called Nenken and Meiretsu-ken (meanings unknown). He is Musashi's trusted partner.


A clumsy ninja boy who claims to be "Musashi's first disciple" or "the ninja of ninjas".


A priest in Daitoku-ji temple, as well as the pioneer of Gundoh martial arts. He is a very skilled Gundoh practitioner who can "fall fighting" from the sky. The BS-i website, as well as the DVD cover, describes him as a "worn-out old man", which doesn't quite seem to suit him.


She is a sexy foreign woman who seeks revenge against Musashi for the murder of her father. Musashi, however, denies responsibility for the killing.


She is the stepdaughter of Toyotomi Hideyoshi, and the princess of Osaka Castle. She is an incredibly strong woman who can fight against Ayakashi with her bare hands, even whilst airborne. It is rumored that her existence is the "trigger" that makes Musashi Gundoh's history different from our own.


He is a master of karakuri, who owns a mechanical goods shop. He can speak a little English, as demonstrated in his first meeting with Desperado. His pseudonym is "Dabi-no-ji" ("the Initial Dabi"), but his real name is Leonardo da Vinci. His character is based on the Italian maestro of the same name.


A "ninja monkey" bred by Dabi-no-ji. His true identity is that of Sasuke Sarutobi, one of the Sanada Ten Braves. He was transformed by the gramary of Yasha because he learned too much about Yasha's plans. Although he is called a "genius ninja", his skills are only equal to that of Ninja-Taro.

The Horse
Kaguya's horse, which is well-trained, and always appears to be calm. Even when his master is kidnapped by crows, he remains calm and faces front, directly towards the viewers. This horse is arguably the anime's most popular character.

Ayakashi side


He is the top of Ayakashi monsters. He knows the "true" unaltered history, and gives his power to Ryogen. Not much is known about him, including his sex. In a TV credit, his name is mistyped as  more than once.


He is actually Tokugawa Ieyasu. Yasha tells him that in the "true" history, Ryogen is the one who owns the shogunate. Knowing this, Ryogen tries to take over Toyotomi shogunate, using ayakashi's power.

(Voiced by: unknown)
Ayakashi that attacks into Daitkuji temple by the 2nd story. It is a size at the same level as a man; there are two to three corners, and there is a wing like the bat on the back. This wing flaps, and the gust is caused. The bullet can be driven back by using the barrier. The weak points were eyes, and it had been defeated before "(fall fighting)" of the killer shot of the Priest Takuan.

()
Ayakashi of spider that afflicts Musashi and Priest Takuan from the third story to the 5th story. It has spiders' legs, though it has the face of human. It can manipulate humans by vomiting a very strong Spider's Thread of magic from the mouth. Because the spider in the heavens has been changed into the Ayakashi, it is not possible to knock it down with arms for the Ayakashi. The model appeared in novel " " of the Ryūnosuke Akutagawa, and is a Spider’s Thread that leads the kandata of the criminal who landed in hell to the paradise.

See also

 Lost Universe
 MD Geist
 Gun Kata (Gundoh seems to be influenced by this fictional martial art.)

References

External links
 Program guide by BS-i 
 

Anime series